Al Ahly Volleyball Club, also called "The Masters" is one of Al Ahly SC club's sections that represent the club in Egypt and in international volleyball competitions. The club team section has been based in Cairo since 1932. Al Ahly volleyball team can be considered the greatest team in Africa and the Middle East. It has played in the Egyptian Volleyball League without interruption since 1957. Al Ahly is the most titled club in the Egyptian Volleyball league with 33 titles. Also, the team has participated in African Clubs Championship since 1980 and achieved the title 15 times.

Al Ahly has participated in FIVB Club World Championship three times in 2010, 2011 and 2015, the team was qualified in 2003 but the FIVB canceled it. Al Ahly is the only Egyptian team that achieved four trophies in the same season, and the only African team that won the Champions League and Winner's Cup in the same season. In 1981 Al Ahly won the Afro-European volleyball championship, which was held in Netherlands.
Al Ahly is the most titled club in the world with international trophies and 21 titles (here), ahead of famous Russian and Italian clubs. Al Ahly also have a world record, having the longest unbeaten streak by achieving 102 consecutive wins in all competitions. the streak started 5 April 2017 until 29 January 2020 during this period Al-Ahly achieved 6 titles and this streak is the longest in the world in all competitions, Al Ahly also had a local and African record by achieving a record of 56 consecutive wins without defeat from 20 November 2009 until 16 December 2010.

History

From 1932 to mid of 1950s 

Volleyball journey in Al Ahly SC started by 1932. At this era, the volleyball was not a popular sport like what it is now. There was not many clubs which own volleyball teams. Hence, Al Ahly SC was one of the pioneer's clubs in Egypt to introduce this sport into the Egyptian sports community, helping to promote its popularity as well locally. 
In general, Volleyball was introduced into the Egyptian sports field by the foreign communities, specially those from Mediterranean countries, e.g., Italy and Greece. The 1st club ever in Egypt to introduce and play this sport, was Al Shobban Al Meseheyin club. This was at the inception of  the 1920s era. 
By 1933, roots of volleyball were cemented within Al Ahly. Al Ahly formed his 1st volleyball team ever and started to play some friendly games. E.g., a game against Younan (Greek) club on 1 September 1933. 
The game ended by 3-1 for Al Ahly. The game was held on Al Ahly ground at Al Gazera. Al Ahly formation for this game was as following; Aziz Fahmy, Ahmed Shoeir. Aziz Barsoum, Mostafa Kamel, Rasmy, and Mokhtar.  
The second friendly game was played against Al Shobban Al Meseheyin on the 3rd of October 1933, ended by 3-1 for Al Ahly, where the squad was formed of; Aziz Fahmy, Ahmed Shoeir, Aziz Barsom, Mostafa Kamel, Rasmy, and Mokhtar. The game played at Al Ahly ground. 
The 3rd game in the history of Al Ahly volleyball team, was played against Younan (Greek) club on 18 October 1933. It was a friendly away game on Greek club ground. Al Ahly squad for this game was; Aziz Fahmy, Ahmed Shoeir, Aziz Barsom, Mostafa Kamel, Rasmy, Mokhtar, and Mohamed Fahmy. 
In 1947, the Egyptian volleyball federation (Which at that time was managing and leading all competitions for both sports volleyball and basketball in Egypt), participated in the formation of the Fédération Internationale de Volleyball 
On 1949, Al Ahly and other 13 clubs contributed in establishing the 1st official committee meeting for the Egyptian volleyball federation who was at that time officially dissociated from the basketball federation, and became a separated independent volleyball federation

From mid of 1950s to mid of 1970s 
By the middle of the 1950s, the Egyptian volleyball league was established and during this era, Al Ahly was managed by Ayman Sameh. The squad was composed of the following players: Sayed Mostafa (Captain), Samy Al Seba’y, Yousef Mostafa, Zakaria Morgan, AbdelKhalek Wahba, Maged Mandour. 
1966–1967 season was a special one for the team, when the club managed to clinch its first Egyptian volleyball league title ever. The squad was full of talented players who managed to cement their names in Al Ahly volleyball history. Some notable players in this eras squad were: Mohamad-Fathi El-Rouby, Amr Elwany, AbdelKahled Wahba, Adly Mostafa, AbdelRahman AlWakil, Fou’ad AbdelSalam, Nabeh Salah, Ayman Ghozlan, Adel AbdelMaksoud, Tawfiek Shehab, Mohamed Al Sharif, Nezar Al Zein, Eid AbdelMalak, The team was managed by Sayed Mostafa (Ex-team captain), and the coach was Abdel Latif Ibrahim.

From mid of 1970s to mid of 1980s 
This was one of the most shining parts in Al Ahly volleyball history. The team managed to dominate all competitions. At this era, Al Ahly managed to clinch 9 titles of the Egyptian volleyball league (won 9 out of 10 played). Also, managed to win two Egyptian Volleyball cups. The team also won the African champions league twice; 1980 and 1983. Both of those African titles were after beating the rival Zamalek in the final. 
On 1981, Al Ahly managed to win Afro-European cup that was held in Netherlands by participation of Champions clubs from France and Netherland. It was a great milestone for Al Ahly volleyball to move its excellence to global level; Europe, not only locally and continentally. 
During this era; the squad formation was: Nour Attia, Mahmoud Farag, Ibrahim Fakhr Eldin, Ring Lual (Sudanese player), Ihab Fakhr Eldin, Ahmed Zakaria, Shaaban Khalifa, Mohamed Shaarawy, Gomaa AbdelHamid, Tarik Farid, Mamdouh Ismail, Wagih Hamdy, Ayman Fakhr Eldin, Reda ElGhazali, Ahmed AlShamoty, Khaled AlShamoty. Tawfik Shehab and Ihab Fakhr Eldin coach the team in this era.

Mid of 1980s to end of the 20th century 
This was a reeling era for Al Ahly. This was because of retirement of the best players, in addition to some other administrative issues during the presidency term of Abdo Saleh Al Wahsh (1988-1992). There was a major conflict between the team players and the club administration, led to departure for the most main and reserve players. 
However, during this era, and until 1993, Al Ahly won 3 Egyptian volleyball league titles, and 3 Egyptian volleyball cups, one Arab Volleyball cup in 1987, two African titles in 1990 (which was held in Egypt on Zamalek SC ground), and in 1991 in Algeria. Both of those African titles were clinched after beating the rival Zamalek in the finals. 
But by 1994, Al Ahly managed to return to conquer the volleyball fields not only in Egypt, but in Africa as well. Al Ahly won the Egyptian Volleyball league 3 consecutive times, 3 consecutive African league cup, and 3 African cup clubs as well. No African team managed to do such achievement to date like Al Ahly has already made in the 1990s.

1995-96 was astonishing season for Al Ahly. The team managed to win 4 titles in one season for the first time: Egyptian league, Egyptian Cup, African league, African cup. Also, the silver medal for the Arab cup after being beaten in the final against Al Hilal (Saudi Arabia). 
Al Ahly finished the 20th century adding new two Egyptian league titles, two Egyptian cups, and African title after beating Zamalek in Ethiopia in 2000 in the final as usual.
In total, between 1995: 2000, Al Ahly won 5 leagues, 2 cups, 3 African league, 4 African cup. Tally of 14 titles. 
It worth mentioning that during this period, the Egyptian cup was cancelled several times regarding the national team commitment with some official tournaments. 
The most notable players during this era were: Emad Farouk, Hisham AbdelRazik, Maged Mostafa, Khaled Abbas, Hany Moselhy, Hamdy ElSafy, Mohamed Moselhy, Mohamed AbdelKarim, Mohamoud Gomaa, Sameh Ali Kamel, Ayman Roshdy, Hisham Salah, Yasin Amin, Mohamed AbdelRahman, Wael ElAydi.

From 2001: Current 
This era started with little bit fluctuating. Al Ahly lost the local league for the first time after years, withdrawn twice from the cup as it was played without the international players; while there was 7 players and the team coach involved in the national team at that time. Al Ahly lost the African league title as well in 2001 in Cairo against Etoile Sahel Tunisia. 
But quickly, Al Ahly managed to return to seize the volleyball competitions in Egypt, Africa, and the middle east.
Al Ahly won the league 3 times, the cup 3 times, and two consecutive Arab cup titles, and two consecutive African titles after beating the Tunisian team Qulaybi in the final, both times in Egypt and Algeria. 
In 2002–03 season, Al Ahly won 4 titles again after clinching the league, cup, Arab cup, and African league. By 2005–06, Al Ahly repeated the same brilliant performance by winning the same 4 titles in one season.

This was so evident, how was Al Ahly so strong in this era. 
By end of 2005–06 season, the player maker Abdalla Abdelsalam left the club to join the Italian side Treviso. This contributed later in losing the league in 2008, and the cup in 2009, two African finals, and one Arab cup final as well by 2009.

Al Ahly, the club of century for Volleyball in Egypt and Africa, quickly progressed and by season 2009-10 managed to make a historic season by winning 4 titles again in one season: League, Cup, Aran cup, and African league. In this season, the team played 54 games, won 53 times, and only losing one game in the preliminary local league stage. 
So, Al Ahly won 4 volleyball titles in the same season 4 times: 1995–96, 2002–03, 2005–06, and 2009–10. The only Egyptian and African team to attain such amazing record.  
After the end of the last-mentioned season, Hamdi ElSafy retired, Abdallah AbdelSalam and Ahmed Salah transferred to Europe, Wael Elaydi moved to the rival Zamalek. All of those factors led to give the opportunity for new and youth players such as: Ahmed Kotb, Hossam Youssef, AbdelHalim Ebo, Ahmed AbdelAal, Mohamed Moawad, Ahmed Saied. 
Between 2015 and 2017, because of dispute with the club sports administration, some of the team players left the club and moved to Army SC. Army SC at that time looked to be like Al Ahly second team (Al Ahly B), and for 3 years, they managed to win 2 leagues, 2 cups, and 1 African title in 2016. Those players were; Ahmed Salah, Abdallah AbdelSalam, Mohamed AlHosseiny, Omar Naguib, Mamdouh AbdelKarim, Mahmoud Ra’of, Mahmoud ElKomy. 
Al Ahly failed to win the league for three times in row. The same for the Egyptian cup. However, Al Ahly won the African titles twice during this period, in 2015 and 2017 in Tunisia. 
By 2017–18 season, Al Ahly back to the good performance and managed to win three titles in one season: League, Cup, African titles. This was without losing any game during the whole season. 
Tally of Al Ahly titles during this era, from 2002 to 2018 was 11 league titles, 12 Egyptian cup, 8 African titles, and 4 Arab cups. This was enough to consider this era as the best across Al Ahly volleyball history. Al Ahly also during this era has participated in the World cup clubs three times; 2010, 2011 and 2015. 
The most notable players in this era (2000:2010) were: Ahmed Salah, Abdallah AbdelSalam, Mohamed ElSayed, Hamdy ElSafy, Mohamed Moselhy, Osama Komsan, Hossam Shaarway, Maged Mostafa, Mohamed AbdelRahman, Wael ElAydi, Mahmoud Ra’ouf. 
(2010: Current) Ahmed Kotb, Hossam Youssedf, AbdelHalim Ebo, Ahmed AbdelAal, Ahmed Saied, Mohamed Adel Dola, Mohamed Moawad

Most consecutive volleyball victories in all competitions 

Beside the total domination of Al Ahly over Africa and being the most crowned club with international trophies all over the world Al Ahly also own the most winning streak known on the volleyball history
Al Ahly is having a 102 win on the row recording a no lose streak for the last 3 years until 29 January 2020
This chain has started on 5 April 2017, During this unbelievable record Al Ahly has been titled with the Egyptian League 2 times, Egyptian Cup 2 times and African Club Championship 2 times
During this chain also Al Ahly has won 18 successive matches with the result 3–0 without losing any set
The total sets won during this streak are 303 sets while losing only 20
The 102 wins details were as follow
83 matches has ended as 3–0, 16 matches with 3–1 and only 2 matches finished with the result 3–2.

36 different teams have been beaten by Al Ahly during this streak, Aviation club is having the most losses by 9 games
Mohamed Moselhy the ex. Al Ahly player was the coach of the team during the whole streak by leading a total of 37 players whom participated during the whole three years and 101 matches

Most titled clubs in the world 
Al Ahly is well-known sporting club which is a pioneer of the majority of all sports fields, not only in Egypt, but in Africa, Arab countries, and the whole Middle East.
It is so rare to find a club which is topping more than two sports by big difference with the nearest competitors. But Al Ahly is already to topping more than one sport within the region of the Middle East. For example, it's so evident by football and volleyball as well, and it is one of the reasons behind why Al Ahly is the greatest sporting club in the Middle East
Masters “which is the preferable name to call Al Ahly volleyball teams by the club supporters”, is the most titled club with the continental titles across the whole world. Al Ahly is far away by difference of 15 continental titles from the closest competitor anywhere. 
Here you can check the most 5 clubs with continental titles across the world in the volleyball

Honours

National achievements 

 :
 Winners: ( 33 titles)15px(Record) :

1965–66, 1966–67, 1967–68, 1975–76, 1976–77, 1977–78, 1979–80, 1980–81, 1981–82, 1982–83, 1983–84, 1984–85, 1986–87, 1989–90, 1993–94, 1994–95, 1995–96, 1998–99, 1999–00, 2001–02, 2002–03, 2003–04, 2005–06, 2006–07, 2008–09, 2009–10, 2010–11, 2012–13, 2013–14, 2017–18, 2018–19, 2019–20, 2020–21
Egyptian Cup : 
 Winners ( 21 titles) (Record) :
1976–77, 1981–82, 1986–87, 1987–88, 1989–90, 1995–96, 1998–99. 2001–02, 2002–03, 2003–04, 2004–05, 2005–06, 2006–07, 2007–08, 2009–10, 2010–11, 2012–13, 2013–14, 2017–18, 2018–19,2019–20

Egyptian Super Cup : 
 Winners ( 1 titles) (Shared Record) : 2023

International Achievements 

African Club Championship : 15 (Record)
 Winners (15 titles) :  1980, 1983, 1995, 1996, 1997, 2003, 2004, 2006, 2010, 2011, 2015, 2017, 2018, 2019, 2022
 Runners-Up (5 vice champions) : 1984, 1987, 2008, 2009, 2014

African Club Championship Cup Winners : 6 (Record)
  Winners (6 titles) :  1990, 1991, 1995, 1996, 1997, 2000
 Runners-Up (1 vice champions) : 2001

Regional Achievements 
Arab Clubs Championship (volleyball) : 8  (Record)
 
 Winners (8 titles) : 1987, 2001, 2002, 2005, 2006, 2010., 2020, 2023

 Runners-Up (2 vice champions) : 1996, 2009

Records 

The times Al Ahly have won more than one trophy during one season.

Current squad

Depth chart

Transfers 

Transfers for the 2022–23 season

 Joining
  Luigi Randazzo from  Prisma Volley
  Yonder García from  Ciudad Habana
  Ahmed Azzab  from Petrojet SC

 Leaving
  Mohamed Moawad to Retire
  Ahmed Abdelaal to ??

Technical and managerial staff

The Most titled clubs with International Trophies

Men's African Competition Records

Men's Arab Competition Records

2017–2018 The trilogy Season

The road to Egy league trophy

The road to The African Title

Derby Record 
Al Ahly VB Vs. Zamalek VB is the derby of Egyptian volleyball competitions, in 2009–12010 the derby competition set a special record: Al Ahly VB won 6 times in same season during 4 consecutive months without any losses against Zamalek VB.

Head coaches 
This is a list of the senior team's head coaches in the recent years.

Kit manufacturers and shirt sponsors

Home arena 

When Al Ahly began to create the teams of Handball, Basketball, and Volleyball, they saw the importance to build an arena to host the home matches of these teams. They first began to make the designs and search for funds in 1978, but due to some funding problems, the project was postponed. Later, on 4 February 1994, Al Ahly opened its sports hall officially under Al Ahly Chairman Saleh Selim.
 
Opening Ceremony
After many years of waiting Al Ahly finally achieved the dream and built its sports hall arena, * on 4 February 1994 Al Ahly officially opened its hall in a big opening ceremony. The ceremony began with opening words from Al Ahly Chairman at that time Saleh Selim and declared that the name of the hall would be "Prince Abdalla El Faisal Hall" due to his contributions to Al Ahly. His son Mohammed El Faisal received a commemorative medal.

The first game held on Al Ahly sports hall was a basketball game between Al Ahly and Ithhadd Alex, after that they played a Futsal match between Al Ahly old players against El Esmailly old players. Mahmoud ElKhatib and Aly Abu Greisha participated at that match

Notable players 

 01-  Ahmed Salah
 02-  Abdallah Abdel Salam
 03-  Hamdy El Safi
 04-  Mohamed Moselhey
 05-  Hany Moselhey
 06-  Emad Farouk
 07-  Mamdouh Ismail
 08-  Fouad Abdel salam
 09-  Amr Elwani
 10-  Fikry Elzanaty
 11-  Ahmed Elshmooty
 12-  Ibrahim Fakr Eldeen
 13-  Ayman Roshdy
 14-  Maged Mostafa
 15-   Mahmoud Farag
 16-   Raouf Abdelkader
 17-  Nour Attia 
 18-   Twafik Shehab
 19-   Ring Lewal
 20-  Ahmed Zakaria
 21-  Ossama Komsan
 22-  Mohamed Abdelrahman
 23-  Wael Al Aidy
 24-   Mahmoud Shaarawy
 25-   Gaber Abdel Salam
 26-   Shan Alexander
 27-  Ehab Fakr Eldeen
 28-  Nabih Salah
 29-  Yasser Salah
 30-  Khaled Elshmooty
 31-  Medhat Kamal

 32-  yassin amin

Club Presidents

See also 
 Al Ahly FC
 Al Ahly (volleyball)
 Al Ahly Women's Volleyball
 Al Ahly (basketball)
 Al Ahly Women's Basketball
 Al Ahly (handball)
 Al Ahly Women's Handball
 Al Ahly (table tennis)
 Al Ahly (water polo)
 Port Said Stadium riot
 Al-Ahly TV

References

External links 
 Al Ahly website
 Al Ahly Volleyball on Facebook
 Al Ahly Volleyball on Twitter
 Fan website
 Fan page

V
Egyptian volleyball clubs
1932 establishments in Egypt
Volleyball clubs established in 1932